Sphuṭacandrāpti (Computation of True Moon) is a treatise in Sanskrit composed by the fourteenth-century CE Kerala astronomer-mathematician Sangamagrama Madhava. The treatise enunciates a method for the computation of the position of the moon at intervals of 40 minutes each throughout the day. This is one of only two works of Madhava that have survived to modern times, the other one being Veṇvāroha. However, both Sphuṭacandrāpti and Veṇvāroha have more or less the same contents, that of the latter being apparently a more refined version of that of the former.

Full text
K. V. Sarma while working in  Vishveshvaranand Institute of Sanskrit and Indological Studies, Hoshiarpur, has brought out in 1973 a critical edition of the treatise with an introduction, translation and notes. The full text of this work, which has only 65 pages, can be accessed from Internet Archive at the following   link:
Sphutachandrapti in Internet Archive (Retrieved on 21 March 2017)
Scanned copies of the pages of the text referred to above  are available in Wikimedia Commons at the following link:
Sphutachandrapti in Wikipedia Commons

See also
Indian mathematics
Indian mathematicians
Kerala school of astronomy and mathematics
Madhava of Sangamagrama

References

Hindu astronomy
History of mathematics
Kerala school of astronomy and mathematics
Indian astronomy texts